Wadler is a surname. Notable people with the surname include:

Gary I. Wadler (1939–2017), American internist with special expertise in the field of drug use in sports
Joyce Wadler (born 1948), American journalist and writer
Naomi Wadler (born 2006), American student and activist against gun violence
Philip Wadler (born 1956), American computer scientist